Amalocichla is a genus of bird in the family Petroicidae that are found in New Guinea.

Species
The genus contains the following two species:
 Greater ground robin (Amalocichla sclateriana)
 Lesser ground robin (Amalocichla incerta)

References

 Del Hoyo, J.; Elliot, A. & Christie D. (editors). (2007). Handbook of the Birds of the World. Volume 12: Picathartes to Tits and Chickadees. Lynx Edicions. 

 
Bird genera
Taxonomy articles created by Polbot